This is an inclusive list of science fiction television programs whose names begin with the letter G.

G
Live-action
G vs E a.k.a. Good vs Evil (1999–2000)
Gabby Duran & the Unsittables (2019-2021)
Galidor: Defenders of the Outer Dimension a.k.a. Galidor (2002)
Galloping Galaxies (1985)
Gangster World (1998, film) a.k.a. The Outsider IMDb
Garth Marenghi's Darkplace (2004, UK)
Gemini Man (1976)
Generation X (1996, film)
Genesis II (franchise):
Genesis II (1973, film, pilot)
Planet Earth (1974, film, pilot)
Strange New World (1975, film, pilot)
Ghosts of Motley Hall (1976)
Giant Robo (franchise):
Giant Robo (1967–1968, Japan) a.k.a. Johnny Sokko and his Flying Robot (US)
Girl from Tomorrow, The (franchise):
Girl from Tomorrow, The (1992, Australia)
Girl from Tomorrow Part II: Tomorrow's End, The (1993, Australia)
Girl, the Gold Watch & Everything, The (franchise):
Girl, the Gold Watch & Everything, The (1980, film) IMDb
Girl, The Gold Watch, and Dynamite, The (1981, film) IMDb
Godzilla (franchise):
Zone Fighter a.k.a. Ryusei Ningen Zone (1973, Japan)
Godzilla Island (1997–1998, Japan)
Goodnight Sweetheart (1993–1999, UK)
Grand Star (2007–2008, Canada/France/Belgium) a.k.a. Compagnie des glaces, La (France/Belgium)
Grande Ourse (2003, Canada) IMDb
Great Space Coaster, The (1981–1986, puppetry)
Greatest American Hero, The (1981–1983)
Guinevere Jones (2002)
Gulliver's Travels (franchise):
Gulliver in Lilliput (1982, UK, miniseries) IMDb
Gulliver's Travels (1996, miniseries)
Gundam (franchise):
G-Saviour (2000, US/Japan, film)

Animation
G.I. Joe (franchise):
G.I. Joe: A Real American Hero (1985–1987, animated)
G.I. Joe: A Real American Hero (1989–1991, animated)
G.I. Joe Extreme (1995–1997, animated)
G.I. Joe: Sigma 6 (2005–2007, animated)
G.I. Joe: Resolute (2009, animated)
G.I. Joe: Renegades (2010–2011, animated)
Gaiking (franchise):
Gaiking (1976–1977, Japan, animated)
Gaiking: Legend of Daiku-Maryu (2005–2006, Japan, animated)
Galactik Football (2006–2011, France, animated)
Galaxy Angel (franchise):
Galaxy Angel (2001–2002, Japan, animated)
Galaxy Angel Z (2002, Japan, animated)
Galaxy Angel A (2002, Japan, animated)
Galaxy Angel AA (2003, Japan, animated)
Galaxy Angel S (2003, Japan, special, animated)
Galaxy Angel X (2004, Japan, animated)
Galaxy Angel Rune (2006, Japan, animated)
Galaxy High (1986, animated)
Galaxy Railways, The (franchise):
Galaxy Railways, The (2003–2004, Japan, animated)
Galaxy Railways: Crossroads to Eternity, The (2006–2007, Japan, animated)
Gankutsuou: The Count of Monte Cristo (2004–2005, Japan, animated)
Gantz (2004, Japan, animated)
Gargantia on the Verdurous Planet a.k.a. Suisei no Gargantia (2013, Japan, animated)
Gasaraki (1998–1999, Japan, animated)
Gatchaman (franchise):
Science Ninja Team Gatchaman a.k.a. Gatchaman (1972–1974, Japan, animated)
Gatchaman II a.k.a. Science Ninja Team Gatchaman II (1978–1979, Japan, animated)
Battle of the Planets (1978–1985, Science Ninja Team Gatchaman adaptation, US/Japan, animated)
Gatchaman Fighter a.k.a. Science Ninja Team Gatchaman Fighter (1979–1980, Japan, animated)
G-Force: Guardians of Space (1986, Science Ninja Team Gatchaman adaptation, US/Japan, animated)
Eagle Riders (1996–1997, Gatchaman II and Gatchaman Fighter adaptation, US/Australia/Japan, animated)
Gatchaman Crowds (2013, Japan, animated)
Gate Keepers (2000, Japan, animated)
Generator Gawl (1998, Japan, animated)
Generator Rex (2010–2013, animated)
Genesis Climber MOSPEADA (1983–1984, Japan, animated)
Genesis of Aquarion (2005, Japan, animated)
Getter Robo (franchise):
Getter Robo (1974–1975, Japan, animated)
Getter Robo G (1975–1976, Japan, animated)
Getter Robo Go (1991–1992, Japan, animated)
Ghost in the Shell: Stand Alone Complex (S.A.C.) (franchise):
Ghost in the Shell: Stand Alone Complex (S.A.C.) (2002–2003, Japan, animated)
Ghost in the Shell: S.A.C. 2nd GIG (2004–2005, Japan, animated)
Ghost in the Shell: Stand Alone Complex – Solid State Society (2006, Japan, film, animated)
Ghostbusters (franchise):
Extreme Ghostbusters (1997, animated)
Real Ghostbusters, The (1986–1991, animated)
Giant Gorg (1984, Japan, animated)
Giant Robo (franchise):
GR: Giant Robo (2007, Japan, animated)
Gilligan's Planet (1982–1983, animated)
Ginga Hyōryū Vifam (franchise):
Ginga Hyōryū Vifam (1983–1984, Japan, animated)
Ginga Hyōryū Vifam 13 (1998, Japan, animated)
Ginga Kikoutai Majestic Prince (2013, Japan, animated)
Ginga Sengoku Gun'yūden Rai (1994–1995, Japan, animated)
Gintama (franchise):
Gintama (2006–2010, Japan, animated)
Yorinuki Gintama-san (2010–2011, Japan, animated)
Gintama' (2011–2013, Japan, animated)
Girl Who Leapt Through Space, The (2009, Japan, animated)
Glass Fleet (2006, Japan, animated)
GoBots (franchise):
GoBots (1984, miniseries, animated)
Challenge of the GoBots a.k.a. Mighty Machine Men (1985, animated)
God, the Devil and Bob (2000)
Godzilla (franchise):
Godzilla (1978–1981, Japan/US, animated)
Godzilla: The Series (1998–2000, US/Japan, animated)
Golden Warrior Gold Lightan (1981–1982, Japan, animated)
Goliath the Super Fighter (1976, Japan, animated)
Gordian Warrior (1979–1981, Japan, animated)
GoShogun (1981, Japan, animated)
Green Lantern: The Animated Series (2011–2012, animated)
Groizer X (1976–1977, Japan, animated)
Guardians of the Galaxy (2015–2019, animated)
Gulliver's Travels (franchise):
Adventures of Gulliver, The (1968–1970, animated)
Gulliver's Travels (1992, Canada/US, animated) IMDb
Gun X Sword a.k.a. Gun vs. Sword (2005–2006, Japan, animated)
Gundam (franchise):
Mobile Suit Gundam (1979–1980, Japan, animated)
Mobile Suit Zeta Gundam (1985–1986, Japan, animated)
Mobile Suit Gundam ZZ (1986–1987, Japan, animated)
Mobile Suit Victory Gundam (1993–1994, Japan, animated)
Mobile Fighter G Gundam (1994–1995, Japan, animated)
Mobile Suit Gundam Wing (1995–1996, Japan, animated)
After War Gundam X a.k.a. Mobile New Century Gundam X (1996, Japan, animated)
Turn A Gundam a.k.a. ∀ Gundam (1999, Japan, animated)
Mobile Suit Gundam SEED (2002–2003, Japan, animated)
Superior Defender Gundam Force (2004, Japan, animated)
Mobile Suit Gundam SEED Destiny (2004–2005, Japan, animated)
Mobile Suit Gundam 00 (2007–2009, Japan, animated)
SD Gundam Sangokuden Brave Battle Warriors (2010–2011, Japan, animated)
Mobile Suit Gundam AGE (2011–2012, Japan, animated)
Gundam Build Fighters (2013–2014, Japan, animated)
Gundam Reconguista in G (2014–2015, Japan, animated)
Gundam Build Fighters Try (2014–2015, Japan, animated)
Mobile Suit Gundam: Iron-Blooded Orphans (2015–2017, Japan, animated)
Gundam Build Divers (2018, Japan, animated)
Gungrave (2003–2004, Japan, animated)
Gurren Lagann a.k.a. Tengen Toppa Gurren Lagann (2007, Japan, animated)
Guyver: The Bioboosted Armor (2005–2006, Japan, animated)

References

Television programs, G